Robert Vaidlo (14 February 1921 in Tartu – 1 October 2004) was an Estonian journalist and children's writer.

Books 
 Lost pike, 1954
 A seagull screams on the Eagle's Hill, 1955
 In name of friendship, 1957
 Gunman Peter Poligon talks, 1958
 Under striped sail, 1964
 Stories from the Town of Kukeleegua, 1965
 Pepper mill, 1965 (for adults)
 The talking thingamajig, 1967
 The awesome marine trip of Dr. Meerike and Ponts-Ontsu, 1971
 Roads always lead somewhere, 1975
 Kessu, 1978
 Story of a monkey, 1988
 Ampa, 1995
 Midli-Madli tilpamised, 2002

See also 

 Rõmuuta

References

1921 births
2004 deaths
Estonian journalists
Estonian children's writers
20th-century journalists
20th-century Estonian writers
Soviet journalists
Soviet children's writers
Writers from Tartu